The City of Morwell was a local government area about  east-southeast of Melbourne, the state capital of Victoria, Australia.

History

Originally split between the Shires of Traralgon and Narracan, Morwell was first incorporated as a shire on 22 May 1892. On 11 December 1916, parts of the Boolarra and Yinnar ridings were annexed to the Shire of Mirboo. On 28 August 1955, the Borough of Moe was severed from Narracan and incorporated, and land from Morwell's western riding was annexed to it. On 23 September 1990, Morwell was proclaimed a city.

On 2 December 1994, the City of Morwell was abolished, and along with the Cities of Moe and Traralgon, the Shire of Traralgon, and parts of the Shires of Narracan and Rosedale, was merged into the newly created Shire of La Trobe.

Wards

The City of Morwell was divided into six wards on 3 August 1991, each of which elected two councillors:
 Churchill Ward
 Rural Ward
 West Ward
 North Ward
 East Ward
 South Ward

Towns and localities
 Boolarra
 Budgeree
 Churchill
 Darlimurla
 Driffield
 Gunyah
 Hazelwood
 Hazelwood North
 Jeeralang
 Jumbuk
 Livingston
 Morwell*
 Yallourn North
 Yinnar
 Yinnar South

* Council seat.

Population

* Estimate in the 1958 Victorian Year Book.

References

External links
 Victorian Places - Morwell Shire and City

Morwell